Noah Cantor  (born January 11, 1971) is a former football player in the Canadian Football League.

Biography
Cantor is Jewish.  Born  in Ottawa, Ontario, Cantor played with the University of Saint Mary's Huskies from 1990 to 1994. He was signed as a free agent by the Toronto Argonauts on February 28, 2003. He re-signed with Toronto February 24, 2004.

In 2006 he announced his retirement from the CFL on April 13, but returned from retirement and signed a contract with Toronto on August 10. On April 17, 2007, Cantor retired for a second time from the Argonauts to focus on the Vancouver hamburger restaurant chain that he co-owns, "Vera's Burger Shack."

Amongst many of the achievements in his CFL career, Noah won four Grey Cup championships. The first two occurred in 1996/97 with the Toronto Argonauts, in his second and third seasons with both the team and in the league. The third championship came in his sixth season in the CFL, his third consecutive with the B.C Lions, in 2000. He set a record of 32 tackles that season. His final Grey Cup came in 2004 while once again playing with the Argos, in his tenth year in the league. It was the second year of a four-year stint with the team. He retired from the league after twelve productive seasons.

See also
List of select Jewish football players

References

External links
Toronto Argonauts bio
Vera's Burger Shack bio
"Noah Cantor: good football player, great person," 12/6/04

1971 births
Living people
BC Lions players
Canadian football defensive linemen
Jewish Canadian sportspeople
Canadian football people from Ottawa
Players of Canadian football from Ontario
Saint Mary's Huskies football players
Toronto Argonauts players